was an official history of the Ryūkyū Kingdom compiled between 1697 and 1701 by a group of scholar-officials led by Sai Taku. It was a Kanbun translated version of Chūzan Seikan.

Later, it was rewritten into Classical Chinese by Sai Taku's famous son Sai On in 1725, and expanded each year until 1876.

See also
List of Cultural Properties of Japan - writings (Okinawa)
Chūzan Seikan
Kyūyō

References

Japanese chronicles
Ryukyu Kingdom
1690s books
1700s books
Edo-period history books